Shinjuku Southern Terrace (新宿サザンテラス) is a commercial zone located at  at the western side of Shinjuku Station Southern Exit. It was built above the Odakyu Odawara Line, to the west of Takashimaya Times Square across the Yamanote Line, and to the south of Shinjuku Mylord. The location opened in April 1998. Shinjuku Southern Terrace is the southern portion of Shinjuku Terrace City, a continuous piece of real estate property owned by Odakyu Group in and around Shinjuku Station.

Shinjuku Southern Terrace is only a one-minute walk away from the South exit of the Shinjuku Station, and a 10-minute walk from the West exit. 

Located in the Odakyu Southern Tower, there are four floors of shops. On the first floor there is El Torito Mexican restaurant. On the second floor, there is a Shake Shack restaurant. On the third floor, there are a FedEx Kinko's office and printing center, Papa Milano Italian Restaurant, and Maharaja Indian restaurant. On the fourth floor are two restaurant/bars: Symphony Orchestra Japanese restaurant, and Banyoh steak restaurant. Also located in the Odakyu Southern Tower in the Hotel Century, located on the 19th through the 35th floors. On the 19th floor there are two restaurants, Shihori Inamori River Seasons Taste and Xenlon. On the 20th floor you have the South Court, which consists of a bar and lounge, and “Tribeks” which is a restaurant.

In the area just outside the Odakyu Southern Tower, is the terrace area, which also has a handful of restaurants. These include Starbucks, Eddie Bauer, and Franc Franc.

Shinjuku Southern Terrace has many different lighting events throughout the year.

External links
 [ Shinjuku Southern Terrace official website] 
 [ Shinjuku Terrace City official website] 

Neighborhoods of Tokyo
Buildings and structures in Shibuya